Kephyrion is a genus of algae belonging to the family Dinobryaceae.

The genus was first described by Pascher in 1911.

Species:
 Kephyrion rubi-claustri Conrad
 Kephyrion spirale (Lackey) Conrad

References

Chrysophyceae
Algae genera
Heterokont genera